The men's road race at the 1991 UCI Road World Championships was the 58th edition of the event. The race took place on Sunday 25 August 1991 in Stuttgart, Germany. The race was won by Gianni Bugno of Italy.

Final classification

References

Men's Road Race
UCI Road World Championships – Men's road race